This contains the list of players who have played for the Rain or Shine Elasto Painters from 2006 to present.



A

B

C

D

E

F

G

H

I

J

K

L

M

N

O

P

Q

R

S

T

U

V

W

Y

References